Tekkeköy is a district of Samsun Province in Turkey located on the western side of the Çarşamba Plain. The Mayor of Tekkeköy Municipality is Hasan Togar.

Agriculture and animal breeding are the main sources of income. Black Sea Copper Works Inc., Samsun Azot Factory, the Organized Industry Site, Industrial Site and Organized Food Industry Site, fertilizer and forging industry, along with a power plant, many surgical instrument manufacturing companies and other manufacturers have facilitated an economically dynamic area.

It is on the coast of the Black Sea and located on the 13th km of the Samsun–Trabzon highway, east of Çarşamba District. Tekkeköy is an easy ride from Samsun with plenty of transport options. There will soon be a railway system to and from Tekkeköy.

The district has a population of nearly 50,000, half of which resides in the center and half in rural areas. A third of the district's land is within the delta of the Yeşilırmak, part of the Çarşamba Plain, which supports irrigation. The daily population is between 100–150k due to the industry sites and many big showrooms on the Samsun – Ordu highway.

The constructions of the Yaşar Doğu Arena and the new city stadium, the international expo and congress center being located within the district and projects such as the Logistics Village, Science and Technology Center, Arts & Culture Center, and Olympic Swimming Pool has served to modernize the district. There are also many hotels of international brands within Tekkeköy.

Samsun Çarşamba Airport is also within the district's limits and very close to the center, making Tekkeköy one of the most important districts of Turkey.    
A 7,500-seat multi-purpose indoor venue, the Tekkeköy Yaşar Doğu Arena, was opened end March 2013 in the town.

Tekkeköy Municipality is a member of the Union Of Historical Towns since September 13, 2015.

History 
In 1941, studies conducted in Tekkeköy and surrounding regions by archeologists Prof. Dr. Tahsin Özgüç and Prof. Nimet Özgüç, and led by Kılıç Kökten, have found that the district has been used as a settlement since the Paleolithic era.

Located south of the current district center, these settlements date back to c. 600,000 – 100,000 BC.

Archeological studies done in the district has also reviled remains from the Hittite and Phrygian eras. These lands were included in the Pontus Empire in the mid 3rd century BC and later were seized by the Roman, the Byzantine and the Anatolian Seljuk empires respectively.

When the Seljuk Empire entered Anatolia, they sent the great Turkish Veli Sheikh Zeynuddin to this important area and established an Islamic lodge (tekke) in order to convert the locals to Islam. Sheikh Zeynuddin, who is thought to have lived c. 1250-1330, cared for the travelers, the poor, and ones in need. It is said that the name Tekkeköy is rooted in that very lodge, as the literal translation for tekke is "holyman's lodge".

In 1399, the Ottomans gained reign over Tekkeköy but briefly lost the land to the Kubatoğulları clan in 1402 following the War of Ankara. However, the area became Ottoman territory once again in 1419 through Celebi Mehmet.

Turks and local Greeks (Rum) peacefully co-existed here during the Ottoman era until the Lausanne Treaty, which required the Turks in Western Thrace and Balkans (especially Thessaloniki, Greece and surrounding regions) to swap places with Greeks in the area. As a result, the inhabitants of Tekkeköy today fall into three main categories: Locals, immigrants from the west, and the exchange population who managed to preserve their cultural heritage.

Furthermore, the Arabian cemetery in Tekkeköy dated back to the 1800s is proof that other tribes had also been here. Romanians also contribute to the rich culture embedded in Tekkeköy.

These different and rich cultures have composed the cultural and folkloric significance of Tekkeköy.

Local attractions

Archeology Valley and caves 
Settlements of the Chalcolithic Period, these caves were naturally formed smaller caves, which were later hollowed out and expanded to become houses. The caves have a multi-leveled structure and therefore can be identified as apartment buildings. The inhabitants of these caves were the ones to establish the first symbiosis culture.

In 1941, studies and excavations led by Prof. Dr. Tahsin Özgüç, member of Ankara University's Language, History and Geography Department, found many prehistoric caves, shelters, and settlements in the area. Hand axes, spearheads, and other sharp objects from the Paleolithic era were also found during these excavations.

Studies and excavations have also revealed grave goods of more advance craftsmanship such as pottery, earrings, bracelets, knives, daggers, spearheads, and pins.

Excavations done 14 km southeast of Dündartepe have revealed remains of Hittite and Early Bronze era. There are mostly potteries of camel and crimson color, which have been shaped on a potter's wheel. And many graves, handcrafted ceramics, vessels with black and white geometric features, and anthropomorphic vases have been found in the Hittite area.

Archeology Valley and other surrounding valleys are fit for hiking, horseback riding, and cycling. They also have magnificent views. 
Fındıcak and Çınarlı streams trance the valley. The hollows and caves of different sizes on the valley cliffs are from the chalcolithic period. 
The mass rock structure, which is located at the intersection of the Çınarcık and Fındıcak streams and overlooks both valleys, is called "Hollow Stone". The technical aspects and forms of the steps that lead up from the rock have been found to be of the Phrygian era. The remains in Tekkeköy are exhibited in the Samsun Archeology Museum and material that represent local eras are exhibited in Turkey's first imitation museum, Tekkeköy Archeology Museum House. There are also sculptures in its garden.

Furthermore, the Archeology Valley will be expanded into an Archeopark.

Replica of Atatürk's House 
An exact replica of Atatürk's birth home in Thessalonica can be seen on the way back from Altınkaya Church, at the main road intersection.

Tekkeköy is one of the most important settlements for the Turks who relocated to the area after the population exchange in 1923. The area, which was previously home to Greek villages and neighborhoods, gained cultural and folkloric significance after the exchange population settled in. Turks who relocated from the Balkans and wanted a reminder of the lands of their ancestors, were the ones to suggest building an exact replica of Atatürk's House in Thessaloniki, and so our municipality built Atatürk's House Museum.

The museum, which has many visitors, exhibits replica furniture of the original house in Thessaloniki, as well as Atatürk's civil and military outfits. On the entrance floor there is a History Library, mostly composed of books about Atatürk. There is also a gift shop on the same floor where visitors can buy souvenirs.

Ancient windmill in Çırakman 
The one and only windmill of the Black Sea region is located in the Çırakman neighborhood in Tekkeköy. This district is an old Greek settlement, which later became home to the Turks who relocated to the area after the population exchange in 1923. Çırakman means "big fire". The Greeks that once lived here used to engage in agriculture and fishing. They set camp on the shore and lit great campfires. Their campfires were a way to attract fish to shallow waters. That big fire was called Çırakman and gave its name to the area.

The ancient windmill, which was built in the late 1800s by Greeks, was restored to its original form thanks to the conservation commission and our municipality.

Today this windmill is fully functional: It can grain wheat. It is also a main touristic site that attracts many local and foreign tourists. It can grain wheat and its roof can rotate to adjust to winds. Inside the windmill is a tiny museum, which was established by the Greeks from Çırakman who went to Georgia and Russia to work in 1830s.

After landscaping the area surrounding the windmill, our municipality set up a picnic area for recreational use.

Back in the day, newlyweds used to come up to the windmill and dip their hands in freshly ground flour, hoping for a fruitful and happy marriage. Today this tradition is still carried out by some of the locals.

Sheikh Yusuf Zeynuddin Mosque and Shrine 
Sheikh Yusuf Zeynuddin is a great İslamic Veli who lived in the time of the Anatolian Seljuk Empire. He is a descendant of Gavs-ı Azam Sheikh Abdulkadir-i Geylani. Sheikh Yusuf Zeynuddin built a mosque in 1285 and there is a shrine in the mosque's garden bearing his name. Along with the mosque, he also established a lodge and soup kitchen to care for the ones in need. Now the municipality carries out this tradition.

Ancient buildings and sites 
There are many ancient buildings and sites in Tekkeköy that have survived time.

To look at them in chronological order:

The first rock graves of the Bronze period are located between the Altınkaya and Ökse neighborhoods. Although placed high in the cliffs of a deep valley, the graves were plundered by previous civilizations and therefore have no findings in them.

There is also a grave at the entrance of the Asarağaç picnic and recreation area dated back to the transitional period of the late archaic and Hellenistic eras, which is thought to be of a person of rank. The entrance hall in the front has collapsed over time, so the entrance is now on the grooved rock side of the structure. On this side, there are four other graves that are thought to belong to the relatives of that person of rank.

There are also many ancient churches in Tekkeköy, most important of which being the Andoria Antyeri (originally Andreandon) Church located in the Antyeri neighborhood. The apse, interior pillars and bell tower are architectural aspects that draw attention. The church is planned to be restored to become a museum and office where tourists can receive information about the area.

A similar church is the Altınkaya Church located in the Altınkaya neighborhood. The Altınkaya Church is known to be the oldest church of the Black Sea region, and its stone grid structure and cubic forms used to achieve acoustics are unique.

Different from the two, is the remains of White (Ak) Church located in the Lower Çinik neighborhood. It stands out architecturally from other churches in Turkey with a rectangular shape and exterior, which has grooved and pillared characteristics.

Finally, the Arched Fountain is located in the Çırakman neighborhood's Kobal area. With a double pillared entrance and dome, this fountain used to serve as a spring water source and with this characteristic, is unique in the Black Sea area. The historic fountain is currently in ruins.

Churches and fountains 
 Andoria Antyeri Church (Andreanadon Church): Antyeri Church is one of the most well preserved churches in the area and is known for its bell tower. It is also registered and currently under restoration.
 Altınkaya Church: This church is contemporary with the church at Cape Jason in neighboring Ordu's Perşembe District. Its stone grid structure and cubic forms used to achieve acoustics are unique.
 Arched Fountain
 White Church (Lower Çinik): Located in the Lower Çinik area, White Church has different architectural characteristics from other churches in the area.
 Çınaralan Church-Mosque: When you hike up towards the Çınaralan Village from the Hollow Stone, a rough narrow road takes you to the Çınaralan Church-Mosque. What used to be a church with only one remaining wall was revised by locals to become a mosque. However, the revisions were poorly executed. There are plans to restore this historic church in a professional manner.
 Church Remains in Yazılar Village: Samsun Preservation Committee District Office had officially registered these remains.

Costel coast 
The long natural sandy beach of Costal is where Tekkeköy district meets the sea. The Bülbül stream, which flows along the main road to Costal, is home to the visiting wild ducks and kingfishers, and also is a nice area for recreational fishing.

If you follow the signs to Samsun Çarşamba Airport off the Samsun – Ordu highway, and take a turn following the signs to Yeni Mahalle and Kurtuluş you reach the Costal Forest. Following the brook on your left will eventually lead you to the sea lined with a virgin beach and summer residences hidden among the pine trees.

The other areas being mostly industrialized makes Costal an important swimming location.

Historically, Genoese sailors have also used this location, the first to call it Costal (Italian: sailor or one that comes from the sea). The Genoese also called Tekkeköy Mağda (place of metal) and set up workshops to craft the metals attained from the local mines. It has been said that the east door of the now destroyed Samsun Castle was called the Mağda Door.

The Hacı Osman grove, which stretches along the coast, Kapaklı Pınar, Kırantepe, Azman, and Asarağaç hills at 700 to 800 m altitudes are popular spots for picnicking and other recreational activities.

Kurşunlu Waterfalls in Büyüklü 
The Kurşunlu Waterfalls are found near Büyüklü.

The old railway station buildings 
The old railway station buildings will be restored and the surrounding area will be prepared to be a nostalgic park with a city museum and tourism information office.

Local cuisine 
The movement within the area of the local population, Circassians, Georgians, and Romans has influenced the cultural richness of Tekkeköy, especially the local cuisine,  such as rice with goose meat. The Ottoman-based "Yufka" is a very thin sheet of pastry dough used to enclose various ingredients, such as meat. "Borek" (mincemeat pastries) (börek). Oven kebabs are popular dishes. The local delicacy, Black Sea anchovy (hamsi) is heavily featured on menus and fabricated into various dishes such as rice and bread. It is also widely served as pan-fried. An important dish is the patented Gama Böreği. The sweet pastry roll Kocakarı Gerdanı (meaning old woman's neck) is a local delicacy, introduced to wide acceptance at fairs.

Festivals and carnivals 
Every year the Tekkeköy Municipality organizes a Nature, Culture, and Tourism Festival.

Traditional Oil Wrestling Championship attracts many visitors and is gradually becoming as important as the Kırkpınar Oil Wrestling Championship.

Annually in the second week of May, there is a Tree Planting and Calf Contest in Karaperçin Village.

Locals also hold Highland Festivals in neighborhoods that are former villages.

References

 
Populated places in Samsun Province